Bushland is an unincorporated community and census-designated place (CDP) in southwestern Potter County, Texas, United States. A small portion of the CDP extends south into Randall County. According to the Handbook of Texas, the community had an estimated population of 130 in 2000.   The community is part of the Amarillo, Texas Metropolitan Statistical Area.

Geography
Bushland is located at  (35.1919978, -102.0646392), at an elevation of 3,825 feet. The community is situated along Interstate 40, approximately 14 miles west of Amarillo in southwestern Potter County.

Bushland is the halfway point between Chicago and Los Angeles, 1,062 miles from either city. The two cities were the original endpoints of U.S. Route 66.

History
Established as a station on the Chicago, Rock Island and Gulf Railway, Bushland was named for William Henry Bush, a Chicago native.  In 1898, land owner Joseph Glidden (the inventor of barbed wire) transferred the Frying Pan Ranch to Mr. Bush, who was his son-in-law. The total cost was $68,000. Thereafter, Bush donated land for a town site and a railroad right-of-way. On July 3, 1908, the town was formally dedicated by Bush and his associate S.H. Smiser.

Farmers soon settled in and around Bushland. A public school district was established, followed by the opening of a post office in January 1909.  The community's population remained small, hovering near 20 during the 1910s and 1920s. By 1940, that figure had risen to 175 with four businesses operating in the community. Throughout the latter half of the twentieth century and into the twenty-first, Bushland's population has remained steady at around 130.

In 2009, Bushland made National News after a gas pipeline ruptured near Prairie West, a local neighborhood. At 1:00 AM on Wednesday, November 4, 2009, a gas line operated by El Paso Natural Gas Company malfunctioned, shooting flames 700 feet into the air. 3 residents of the neighborhood were injured, and transported to Lubbock for health treatment.

Demographics

2020 census

As of the 2020 United States census, there were 2,234 people, 709 households, and 672 families residing in the CDP.

Education
Public education in the community of Bushland is provided by the Bushland Independent School District. The district operates three campuses – Bushland Elementary School (grades PK-4), Bushland Middle School (grades 5-8), and Bushland High School (grades 9-12).  In 2011, Bushland residents voted in favor of a bond issue to build additions to the High School, build a cafeteria for the Middle School and purchase new buses for the district.

Climate
According to the Köppen Climate Classification system, Bushland has a semi-arid climate, abbreviated "BSk" on climate maps.

References

External links

Census-designated places in Texas
Census-designated places in Potter County, Texas
Census-designated places in Randall County, Texas
Unincorporated communities in Texas
Unincorporated communities in Potter County, Texas
Unincorporated communities in Randall County, Texas
Unincorporated communities in Amarillo metropolitan area